ATT 4 FUN is a shopping mall in Xinyi Planning District, Taipei, Taiwan that opened on August 29, 2011. The name "ATT" stands for "attractive". Using the homonym of "FOR", the letters are changed to the number "4", which represents the four major industries of fashion, cultural creation, entertainment, and food. "FUN" combines fashion shopping with eating, drinking, playing, and fun, bringing all-round joy to a better life.

History
The building ATT 4 FUN currently occupies was originally operated by New York New York Shopping Center, which opened in March 2000. However, in August 2010, due to a cumulative loss of NT$1.8 billion since its opening 9 years, the operation of the mall was closed for refurbishment and reopened under the name ATT 4 FUN on August 29, 2011. ATT 4 FUN introduced international fashion brands, American and Japanese street fashion brands, lifestyle design styles, international themed restaurants, a performing arts hall, Sky Lounge Bar and other facilities. The seventh to eighth floors above the ground are stationed by the group's own brand "ATT Show Box". A lift for cars to enter and exit is suitable for large-scale exhibitions, pop music, and art performances.

In September 2014, the "Dream Dessert Paradise" on the fourth level opened. The well-known Japanese space design team planned and designed the theme of Alice in Wonderland, which was the first in Taiwan to convert the entire mall floor into a dessert area. In 2016, ATT 4 FUN's annual revenue exceeded 5 billion yuan. There are skybridges connecting the second floor of the ATT 4 FUN shopping mall with Taipei Xinyi Vieshow Studios, Taipei Nan Shan Plaza, and Taipei 101.

Gallery

See also
 List of tourist attractions in Taiwan
 List of shopping malls in Taipei
 ATT 4 Recharge

References

External links

 

2011 establishments in Taiwan
Shopping malls in Taipei
Shopping malls established in 2011